José Martín Farfán Pulido (born 21 August 1965) is a Colombian former road cyclist, who was a professional from 1988 to 1995. He was nicknamed Farfantastico during his career. Farfán is one of only 4 Colombians to win the Mountain jersey at the Vuelta a España.

Career
In the 1989 Vuelta a España while racing the Stage 15 Time trial Farfán finished in third this was enough to put him into the lead of the race by 2 seconds to eventual winner Pedro Delgado.
Farfán's biggest win of his career was Stage 18 of the 1990 Vuelta a España which he won ahead of teammate and fellow Colombian Fabio Parra. This victory would move Farfán up to 6th overall, he would lose time  in the remaining stages to finish eleventh at the end of the Vuelta. He did end up winning the Mountains classification for most mountain points that year.

Major results
Sources:

1987
 2nd Overall Vuelta de la Juventud de Colombia
1988
 4th Overall Vuelta al Táchira
1st Stage 2b 
1989
 1st Stage 3 Clásico RCN
 Vuelta a España
Wore  after Stage 15
1990
 Vuelta a España
1st  Mountains classification
1st Stage 18
 7th Overall Vuelta a Colombia
1991
 3rd Overall Vuelta a Burgos
 3rd Overall Vuelta a Colombia
1st  Combination classification
1st Stage 6
 9th Overall Critérium du Dauphiné Libéré
 9th Overall Tour of Galicia
1992
 1st Stage 8 Vuelta a Colombia
 1st Stage 2 Vuelta a Burgos
 4th Overall Vuelta a Boyacá
 8th Overall Critérium du Dauphiné Libéré
1st Stage 6
 10th Overall Vuelta a Burgos
1993
 5th Clásica de Almería
 10th Overall Vuelta a Murcia
1994
 1st  Overall Vuelta al Tolima
 2nd Overall Clásico RCN
1st Stage 2
1995
 1st Mountains classification, Clásico RCN

Grand Tour general classification results timeline

References

External links
 

1965 births
Living people
People from Facatativá
Colombian male cyclists
Vuelta a Colombia stage winners
Colombian Vuelta a España stage winners
20th-century Colombian people